Bangladesh–Ivory Coast relations refer to the bilateral relations between Bangladesh and Ivory Coast.

Quayes visit 
Former foreign secretary of Bangladesh Mohamed Mijarul Quayes paid an official visit to Abidjan in 2010.

Contributions of Bangladesh peace keepers 
Bangladeshi peace keepers have been serving in Ivory Coast since 2004 as part of the United Nations Operation in Côte d'Ivoire and are the largest contributor to the mission. Bangladeshi peace keepers provide security services and medical aid. In 2008 and 2013, the peace keepers were awarded the United Missions medal. In 2010, Major General Abdul Hafiz from the Bangladesh Army was appointed the Force Commander of the UN mission in Ivory Coast. The Bangladesh Air Force have also contributed troops to the mission and, as of 2014, have 104 personnel and three Bell-212 helicopters stationed in Ivory Coast.

Agricultural cooperation 
Ivory Coast has been identified as one of a number of West African countries that might provide opportunities for Bangladeshi businesses to lease unused cultivable lands as part of food security programs. Ivory Coast businesses have also expressed an interest in implementing Bangladeshi agricultural technologies.

Economic cooperation 
Bangladeshi investors have expressed an interest in establishing fruit processing industries in Ivory Coast. Bangladeshi medicines and ready made garments have been identified as products with significant demand in Ivory Coast.

See also 
 Foreign relations of Bangladesh
 Foreign relations of Ivory Coast

References 

 
Ivory Coast
Bilateral relations of Ivory Coast